Prince George, Duke of Cumberland may refer to either of the following two British princes:

Prince George of Denmark, the first British Royal Consort
George V of Hanover, a grandchild of George III of the United Kingdom